SK Hlavice is a Czech football club located in Hlavice, Liberec District. It currently plays in the III. třída, jih – Liberec (level 9) league, although the club took part in the Bohemian Football League, which is in the third tier of Czech football, during the 2012–13 season.

References

External links
  

Football clubs in the Czech Republic
Association football clubs established in 1983
Sport in the Liberec Region
Liberec District